(Anthony) Michael Handley is an Anglican priest.

Handley was educated at Spalding Grammar School; Selwyn College, Cambridge; and Chichester Theological College. After a curacy at Thorpe St Andrew he was Anglican Priest on the Fairstead Estate from 1966 to 1972. He was Vicar of Hellesdon from 1972 to 1981; Rural Dean of Norwich North from 1979 to 1981; Archdeacon of Norwich from 1981 to 1993; and Archdeacon of Norfolk from 1993 to 2002.

References

1936 births
Living people
20th-century English Anglican priests
21st-century English Anglican priests
People educated at Spalding Grammar School
Archdeacons of Norwich
Archdeacons of Norfolk
Alumni of Selwyn College, Cambridge
Alumni of Chichester Theological College
People from Broadland (district)